Loch an Eilein is a small irregular shaped, freshwater loch in the Rothiemurchus Forest about  south of Aviemore, Scotland in Cairngorms National Park. Loch an Eilein comes from the Scottish Gaelic and means 'Loch of the island'. The loch is considered to be beautiful and walks around it are popular.

History of usage

In the late 18th and early 19th century, the loch was used mainly for two things. On the banks of the loch there is a limestone kiln where the limestone was collected from a rockface looking over the loch. Also loggers used the connecting river to float logs down to the wood-treating factories downstream. Rob Roy and other cattle rustlers used the loch, and one side of the loch is called 'Robbers Way'. There are only three remaining houses on the loch.  One of the former farm sites is now being used as the location for the Loch an Eilein Gallery.

Loch an Eilein castle

In the middle of the Loch, on what may be a natural island, are the ruins of a small 14th century castle. It was originally constructed as a place of refuge from thieves and threatening activities. The castle is said to have once been the property of Alexander Stewart the Wolf of Badenoch.

The castle was the site of conflict. The Jacobites, retreating from Cromdale in 1690, besieged the castle. Dame Grizel Mor Grant, widow of the fifth laird Grant, held the castle against the Jacobites. The castle fell out of use in the late 18th century.

The castle may have originally been connected to the shore by a causeway. The causeway became submerged when the water level in the loch was raised by estate work and the building of a dam in the 18th century. The castle was used as the site of the island graveyard in BBC TV’s ‘Monarch of the Glen’.

About the park

Located in Cairngorms National Park, the loch and the forest around it are popular with birdwatchers, walkers, mountain bikers and day-trippers. Among the birds found on or around Loch an Eilein are the crested tit, common redstart, spotted flycatcher, tree pipit, red-throated diver, common sandpiper, whinchat, and the occasional merlin. The Loch has been voted on the UK's best picnic spot. The Loch an Eilein park has numerous facilities, including washrooms, visitor centre, and a car park. It is notable for its accessibility due to the flat and even nature of the five kilometre trail which loops around the loch.

References

External links
 Engraving of Loch-an-Eilan by James Fittler in the digitised copy of Scotia Depicta, or the antiquities, castles, public buildings, noblemen and gentlemen's seats, cities, towns and picturesque scenery of Scotland, 1804 at National Library of Scotland

Lochs of Highland (council area)
Badenoch and Strathspey
Freshwater lochs of Scotland
LEilein